Black Bear Road or Black Bear Pass, and officially Forest Service Road 648, is a dirt road that starts from the  summit of Red Mountain Pass on U.S. Highway 550 (between Ouray and Silverton) to Telluride, Colorado. The road crests at Black Bear Pass, elevation , and descends over a set of switchbacks as it navigates the heights above Telluride. The road passes Bridal Veil Falls, the highest waterfall in Colorado. In 1975, the road was the subject of a spoken-word song and album of the same title by country musician C. W. McCall.

Black Bear Road is open a few months of the year, from late summer (usually the last week of July) to early fall. The road is traveled only downhill from Red Mountain Pass — except for the annual Jeeper's Jamboree in which travel is reversed for one day only. The start of the trail was formerly marked along U.S. 550 with a sign that read:

{| style="margin: 1em auto;"
|-----
TELLURIDE ——>
CITY OF GOLD
12 MILES - 2 HOURS
YOU DON'T HAVE TO BE
CRAZY TO DRIVE THIS
ROAD - BUT IT HELPS

JEEPS ONLY
|}
After repeated thefts of the sign, the local authorities stopped replacing it.

References

External links

 Narrowgauge.org: The Infamous Black Bear Road  —  article with a collection of photographs.
 Bushducks.com open trails: Black Bear Road - with seasonal road open/closed listing.

Roads in Colorado
San Juan Mountains (Colorado)
Transportation in San Juan County, Colorado
Transportation in San Miguel County, Colorado
Uncompahgre National Forest